Brett Ryan Eldredge  (born March 23, 1986) is an American country music singer, songwriter and record producer, signed to Warner Music Group Nashville. Eldredge has had five No. 1 singles on the Billboard Country Airplay chart, three of which came from his debut album, Bring You Back: "Don't Ya", "Beat of the Music", and "Mean to Me".

Early life
Eldredge was born on March 23, 1986, in Paris, Illinois, the son of Robin Beth (née Vonderlage) and Christopher "Chris" Eldredge. He has an older brother, Brice. He studied at Elmhurst College in Elmhurst, Illinois.  His cousin, Terry Eldredge, is a former member of the Grascals.

Career 
Eldredge co-wrote the track "I Think I've Had Enough" for Gary Allan, who recorded it for his eighth studio album, Get Off on the Pain. By late 2010 he had signed to Atlantic Records and released his debut single, "Raymond" on September 27, 2010. It debuted at number 52 on the US Billboard Hot Country Songs chart dated for the week ending October 16, 2010 and reached a peak of number 23. "It Ain't Gotta Be Love" was released as his second single and reached number 46. Eldredge performed on the Grand Ole Opry on October 29, 2010.

A third single, "Don't Ya", was released to country radio in October 2012. It became his first single to reach the top 20 of the Hot Country Songs chart and his first to appear on the Billboard Hot 100. His debut studio album, Bring You Back, was released on August 6, 2013. "Don't Ya" reached number one on the Country Airplay chart the same month. The album's second single, "Beat of the Music", also reached number one on the same chart. The album's third single, "Mean to Me", was released to country radio on July 14, 2014. It reached number one on the Country Airplay chart in March 2015.

Eldredge's sixth single overall, "Lose My Mind", was released in 2015. It is the lead single to his second studio album, Illinois. It reached number one on the Country Airplay chart in October 2015. The album's second single, "Drunk on Your Love" released to country radio on November 9, 2015. It reached at number two on the Country Airplay chart in April 2016. The album's third single, "Wanna Be That Song" released to country radio on May 23, 2016. It reached at number one on the Country Airplay in January 2017. He was one of the opening acts on Taylor Swift's Red Tour. On Memorial Day 2015, he sang "Take Me Out to The Ballgame" during the seventh Inning Stretch at Wrigley Field while the Cubs played host to the Washington Nationals.

In 2016, Eldredge was selected as one of 30 artists to perform on "Forever Country", a mash-up track of Take Me Home, Country Roads; On the Road Again; and I Will Always Love You which celebrates 50 years of the CMA Awards.

Eldredge released his first Christmas album, Glow, in October 2016.

In March 2017, he released "Somethin' I'm Good At", the lead single to his self titled fourth studio album. The album's second single, "The Long Way" released to country radio on August 21, 2017, and peaked at #3. The album's third single was "Love Someone."

On April 17, 2020, Eldredge released the single "Gabrielle", the lead single off his fifth studio album Sunday Drive, released on July 10, 2020.

On April 22, 2022, Eldredge released the single "Songs About You", the lead single from the album of the same name; the album was released on June 17, 2022.

Discography 

 Bring You Back (2013)
 Illinois (2015)
 Glow (2016)
 Brett Eldredge (2017)
 Sunday Drive (2020)
 Mr. Christmas (2021)
 Songs About You (2022)

Awards and nominations

References

External links 
 

American country singer-songwriters
Atlantic Records artists
Living people
Country musicians from Illinois
1986 births
People from Paris, Illinois
American male singer-songwriters
Singer-songwriters from Illinois
21st-century American singers
21st-century American male singers